{{Infobox nobility title
| name              = Earldom of Clanricarde
| image             =  
| image_size        =  
| alt               =  
| caption           = Arms: of de Burgh/Burke: Or, a cross gules in the first quarter a lion rampant sable.
| creation_date     = 1543 (1st creation)1800 (2nd creation)
| creation          =  
| monarch           = Henry VIII
| peerage           = Peerage of Ireland
| baronetage        =  
| first_holder      = Ulick Burke, 1st Earl of Clanricarde
| last_holder       =  
| present_holder    = Sebastian Browne, 12th Marquess of Sligo
| heir_apparent     = Christopher Browne, Earl of Altamont
| heir_presumptive  =  
| remainder_to      = 1st creation: 1st Earl's heirs male2nd creation: 13th Earl's heirs male, with remainder to heirs male of his daughters
| subsidiary_titles = Earl of St Albans (E: 1628)Viscount Tunbridge (E: 1624)Viscount Galway (E: 1628)Viscount Bourke of Clanmories (I: 1629)Baron of Dunkellin (I: 1543)Baron of Somerhill (E: 1624)Baron of Imanney (E: 1628)Baron Somerhill (UK: 1826)
| status            = Extant (2nd creation)
| extinction_date   = 1916 (1st creation)
| family_seat       = Portumna Castle
| former_seat       = Somerhill House
| motto             = UNG ROY, UNG FOY, UNG LOY  (One king, one faith, one law)| footnotes         =  
}}

Earl of Clanricarde is a title that has been created twice in the Peerage of Ireland, first in 1543 and again in 1800. The former creation became extinct in 1916 while the 1800 creation is extant and held by the Marquess of Sligo since 1916.

Clanricarde was a Gaelic title meaning "(head of) Richard's family" (also known as Mac William Uachtar/Upper Mac William) and this family were descended from Richard Mór de Burgh, 1st Lord of Connacht (d.1243), son of William de Burgh (d.1205/6), founder of the de Burgh/Burke family in Ireland.

In 1543, Ulick na gCeann Burke, 12th Clanricarde, was created Baron of Dunkellin and Earl of Clanricarde in the Peerage of Ireland. His great-grandson, the fourth Earl, was created Baron of Somerhill and Viscount Tunbridge in 1624 and Baron of Imanney, Viscount Galway and Earl of St Albans in 1628, all in the Peerage of England. His son, Ulick Burke, the fifth Earl, was a prominent Royalist during the Civil War. In 1646 he was created Marquess of Clanricarde in the Peerage of Ireland. In c.1650 he also succeeded his cousin as third Viscount Bourke of Clanmories according to a special remainder in the letters patent (see below). On his death, in 1657, the marquessate and the English titles became extinct. However, he was succeeded in the Irish titles by his second cousin, the sixth Earl. He was the son of The Hon. Sir William Bourke, third son of the third Earl. He died without male issue and was succeeded by his younger brother, the seventh Earl.

His younger son, the ninth Earl (who succeeded his elder brother Richard), fought in the army of James II of England (VII of Scotland), was created by him Baron Bourke of Bophin, and was taken prisoner at the Battle of Aughrim in 1691. He was outlawed and attainted with his estates forfeited. However, in 1701, Lord Clanricarde was acquitted by Act of Parliament and restored to his estates. His grandson, the eleventh Earl, assumed the ancient surname of de Burgh in lieu of Burke (or Bourke). His eldest son, the twelfth Earl, was created Marquess of Clanricarde in the Peerage of Ireland in 1789. He was childless and on his death the marquessate became extinct. He was succeeded in the other titles by his younger brother, the thirteenth Earl. He was a general in the British Army. Lord Clanricarde was elected as one of the 28 original Irish Representative Peers in 1800. The same year, he was created Earl of Clanricarde (second creation) in the Peerage of Ireland, with remainder, failing male issue of his own, to his daughters Lady Hester Catherine de Burgh (wife of Howe Browne, 2nd Marquess of Sligo) and Lady Emily de Burgh, and the heirs male of their bodies according to priority of birth.

His son, the fourteenth Earl, was a noted politician. He was created Marquess of Clanricarde in the Peerage of Ireland in 1825. In 1826 he was also made Baron Somerhill, of Somerhill in the County of Kent, in the Peerage of the United Kingdom. This title gave the Marquesses an automatic seat in the British House of Lords. Lord Clanricarde married The Hon. Harriet Canning, daughter of Prime Minister George Canning and his wife Joan. His eldest son, Lord Dunkellin, died in 1867. The 1st Marquess was succeeded by his second son, the 2nd Marquess, who assumed by Royal Licence the additional surname of Canning in 1862 as heir of his maternal uncle, Charles, 1st Earl Canning. Lord Clanricarde later represented County Galway in Parliament as a Liberal. On his death, in 1916, all the titles became extinct, except the second (1800) creation of the Earldom of Clanricarde, which passed according to the special remainder to his cousin, The 6th Marquess of Sligo. He was the grandson of the aforementioned Lady Hester Catherine de Burgh and Howe Browne, 2nd Marquess of Sligo.

The title of Viscount Bourke of Clanmories in the County of Mayo, was created in the Peerage of Ireland in 1629 for The Hon. John Bourke, fourth son of Ulick Burke, 3rd Earl of Clanricarde. The peerage was created with remainder to the heirs male of his father. Lord Bourke was succeeded by his son, the second Viscount. On his death, around 1650, he was succeeded according to the special remainder by his cousin the fifth Earl of Clanricarde. The titles remained united until their extinction in 1916.

Other members of the family included John "na Seamar" Burke, younger son of the second Earl, who claimed the Barony of Leitrim and his sons Redmond Burke, Lord Leitrim and William Burke, Lord of Bealatury. Another was Ulick Burke, younger son of the seventh Earl, who was created Viscount Galway in 1687.

Earls of Clanricarde; First creation (1543)
Ulick nagCeann Burke (de Burgh), 1st Earl of Clanricarde (died 1544)
Richard Burke, 2nd Earl of Clanricarde (died 1582)
Ulick Burke, 3rd Earl of Clanricarde (died 1601)
Richard Burke, 4th Earl of Clanricarde, 1st Earl of St Albans (died 1635) (created Earl of St Albans in 1628)
Ulick Burke, 5th Earl of Clanricarde, 2nd Earl of St Albans (died 1657) (created Marquess of Clanricarde in 1646)

Marquess of Clanricarde; First creation (1646)
Ulick Burke, 1st Marquess of Clanricarde (died and extinct in 1657)

Earls of Clanricarde; First creation (1543; Reverted)
Richard Burke, 6th Earl of Clanricarde  (died 1666)
William Burke, 7th Earl of Clanricarde (died 1687)
Richard Burke, 8th Earl of Clanricarde (died 1704)
John Burke, 9th Earl of Clanricarde (1642–1722) (created Baron Bourke of Bophin in 1691)
Michael Burke, 10th Earl of Clanricarde (died 1726)
John Smith (Burke) de Burgh, 11th Earl of Clanricarde (1720–1782)
Henry de Burgh, 12th Earl of Clanricarde (1743–1797) (created Marquess of Clanricarde in 1789)

Marquess of Clanricarde; Second creation (1789)
Henry de Burgh, 1st Marquess of Clanricarde (1743–1797)

Earls of Clanricarde; First creation (1543; Reverted)
John de Burgh, 13th and 1st Earl of Clanricarde (1744–1808) (created Earl of Clanricarde in 1800)
Ulick de Burgh, 14th and 2nd Earl of Clanricarde (1802–1874) (created Marquess of Clanricarde in 1825)

Marquess of Clanricarde; Third creation (1825)
Ulick de Burgh, 1st Marquess of Clanricarde (1802–1874)
Ulick Canning de Burgh, Lord Dunkellin (1827–1867)
Hubert de Burgh-Canning, 2nd Marquess, 15th and 3rd Earl of Clanricarde (1832–1916)

 Earls of Clanricarde; Second creation (1800; Reverted)
George Ulick Browne, 6th Marquess of Sligo, 4th Earl of Clanricarde (1856–1935)
Ulick John Browne, 7th Marquess of Sligo, 5th Earl of Clanricarde (1898–1941)
Arthur Howe Browne, 8th Marquess of Sligo, 6th Earl of Clanricarde (1867–1951)
Terence Morris Browne, 9th Marquess of Sligo, 7th Earl of Clanricarde (1873–1952)
Denis Edward Browne, 10th Marquess of Sligo, 8th Earl of Clanricarde (1908–1991)
Jeremy Ulick Browne, 11th Marquess of Sligo, 9th Earl of Clanricarde (1939–2014)
Sebastian Ulick Browne, 12th Marquess of Sligo, 10th Earl of Clanricarde (b. 1964)

The heir apparent is the present holder's son Christopher Ulick Browne, Earl of Altamont (b. 1988)

 Viscounts Bourke of Clanmories (1629)
John Bourke, 1st Viscount Bourke of Clanmories (d. 1635)
Thomas Bourke, 2nd Viscount Bourke of Clanmories (d. c.1650)
Ulick Burke, 1st Marquess of Clanricarde, 5th Earl of Clanricarde, 3rd Viscount Bourke of Clanmories (d. 1657)
Richard Burke, 6th Earl of Clanricarde, 4th Viscount Bourke of Clanmories  (d. 1666)see above for further Viscounts Bourke of Clanmories''

See also
House of Burgh
Clanricarde (Mac William Uachtar/Upper Mac William) or Galway (Upper Connaught) Burkes
Marquess of Sligo
Viscount Galway, viscountcy created in the Peerage of Ireland in 1628 and 1687
Baron Leitrim, barony created in the Peerage of Ireland

References

External links

Earldoms in the Peerage of Ireland
Extinct earldoms in the Peerage of Ireland
House of Burgh
Earl
1543 establishments in Ireland
Noble titles created in 1543
Noble titles created in 1800
Peerages created with special remainders